Denner Paulino Barbosa (born November 21, 1993), simply known as Denner, is a Brazilian footballer who plays as a left back for São Bento.

Career
Born in Guarulhos, Denner began his career in the youth of the Corinthians. With good performances in the Copa São Paulo de Futebol Júnior in 2011, the left back was called by the technical committee to gain experience in professional cast of Corinthians. Recently, Denner was called up to join the Brazil U-17 on the left side. He joined the cast of the Brazil U-17 victory in 2011. In 2012, the left back part of the team eight times champion Copa São Paulo de Futebol Júnior.

Statistics

Honours
Corinthians Paulista
 Copa São Paulo de Futebol Júnior: 2012
 Campeonato Brasileiro Série A: 2011

External links
 

1993 births
Living people
People from Guarulhos
Brazilian footballers
Brazilian expatriate footballers
Association football defenders
Campeonato Brasileiro Série A players
Campeonato Brasileiro Série B players
Campeonato Brasileiro Série C players
Liga Portugal 2 players
Sport Club Corinthians Paulista players
Clube Atlético Bragantino players
Atlético Clube Goianiense players
Boa Esporte Clube players
Clube Atlético Penapolense players
Red Bull Brasil players
FC Cascavel players
Associação Portuguesa de Desportos players
Esporte Clube São Bento players
F.C. Famalicão players
Rio Claro Futebol Clube players
Nacional Atlético Clube (SP) players
Grêmio Esportivo Juventus players
Brazilian expatriate sportspeople in Portugal
Expatriate footballers in Portugal
Footballers from São Paulo (state)